Egan House is a Northwest Regional style house in Seattle. It was designed by Robert Reichert in 1958 for retired United States Navy Rear Admiral Willard Egan. The public development authority Historic Seattle restored the house in 2003 and owns it . It was designated a Seattle Landmark in 2010. The house lies within the St. Mark's Greenbelt.

References

Further reading

External links

Egan House at Historic Seattle
Egan House at City of Seattle Landmarks Preservation Board (2009)

1958 establishments in Washington (state)
Houses completed in 1958
Buildings and structures in Seattle
Landmarks in Seattle
International style architecture in Washington (state)